This article shows all participating team squads at the 2010 FIVB Volleyball World League, played by 16 countries.

The following is the  roster in the 2010 FIVB Volleyball World League.

The following is the roster in the 2010 FIVB Volleyball World League.

The following is the roster in the 2010 FIVB Volleyball World League.

The following is the roster in the 2010 FIVB Volleyball World League.

The following is the roster in the 2010 FIVB Volleyball World League.

The following is the roster in the 2010 FIVB Volleyball World League.

The following is the roster in the 2010 FIVB Volleyball World League.

The following is the roster in the 2010 FIVB Volleyball World League.

The following is the roster in the 2010 FIVB Volleyball World League.

The following is the roster in the 2010 FIVB Volleyball World League.

The following is the roster in the 2010 FIVB Volleyball World League.

The following is the roster in the 2010 FIVB Volleyball World League.

The following is the roster in the 2010 FIVB Volleyball World League.

The following is the roster in the 2010 FIVB Volleyball World League.

The following is the  roster in the 2010 FIVB Volleyball World League.

The following is the  roster in the 2010 FIVB Volleyball World League.

References

External links
Official website

Volleyball Team sport
2010
2010 in volleyball